
Pontiac Academy for Excellence (PAE) is a K-12 public charter school located in Pontiac, Michigan. Pontiac Academy for Excellence was established in 2000. The school is located at 196 Cesar E. Chavez Ave., Pontiac, Michigan 48343.

References

External links
School website

Public elementary schools in Michigan
Public middle schools in Michigan
Public high schools in Michigan
Educational institutions established in 2000
Schools in Pontiac, Michigan
High schools in Oakland County, Michigan
Charter schools in Michigan
2000 establishments in Michigan